Peace is a concept of societal friendship and harmony in the absence of hostility and violence. In a social sense, peace is commonly used to mean a lack of conflict (such as war) and freedom from fear of violence between individuals or groups. 

"Psychological peace" (such as peaceful thinking and emotions) is perhaps less well defined, yet often a necessary precursor to establishing "behavioural peace."  Peaceful behaviour sometimes results from a "peaceful inner disposition."  Some have expressed the belief that peace can be initiated with a certain quality of inner tranquility that does not depend upon the uncertainties of daily life. The acquisition of such a "peaceful internal disposition" for oneself and others can contribute to resolving otherwise seemingly irreconcilable competing interests. Peace is not a state of excitement although we are happy when excited, but peace is when one's mind is quiet and satisfied.

Etymology 

The term 'peace' originates most recently from the Anglo-French pes, and the Old French pais, meaning "peace, reconciliation, silence, agreement" (11th century).  The Anglo-French term pes itself comes from the Latin pax, meaning "peace, compact, agreement, treaty of peace, tranquility, absence of hostility, harmony." The English word came into use in various personal greetings from c. 1300 as a translation of the Hebrew word shalom, which, according to Jewish theology, comes from a Hebrew verb meaning 'to be complete, whole'. Although 'peace' is the usual translation, however, it is an incomplete one, because 'shalom,' which is also cognate with the Arabic salaam, has multiple other meanings in addition to peace, including justice, good health, safety, well-being, prosperity, equity, security, good fortune, and friendliness, as well as simply the greetings, "hello" and "goodbye". On a personal level, peaceful behaviours are kind, considerate, respectful, just, and tolerant of others' beliefs and behaviors – tending to manifest goodwill.

This latter understanding of peace can also pertain to an individual's introspective sense or concept of her/himself, as in being "at peace" in one's own mind, as found in European references from c. 1200. The early English term is also used in the sense of "quiet", reflecting calm, serene, and meditative approaches to family or group relationships that avoid quarreling and seek tranquility — an absence of disturbance or agitation.

In many languages, the word for peace is also used as a greeting or a farewell, for example the Hawaiian word aloha, as well as the Arabic word salaam. In English the word peace is occasionally used as a farewell, especially for the dead, as in the phrase rest in peace.

Wolfgang Dietrich, in his research project which led to the book The Palgrave International Handbook of Peace Studies (2011), maps the different meanings of peace in different languages and regions across the world. Later, in his Interpretations of Peace in History and Culture (2012), he groups the different meanings of peace into five peace families: Energetic/Harmony, Moral/Justice, Modern/Security, Postmodern/Truth, and Transrational, a synthesis of the positive sides of the four previous families and the society.

History 
In ancient times and more recently, peaceful alliances between different nations were codified through royal marriages. Two examples, Hermodike I (c. 800 BC) and Hermodike II (c. 600 BC) were Greek princesses from the house of Agamemnon who married kings from what is now Central Turkey. The union of Phrygia / Lydia with Aeolian Greeks resulted in regional peace, which facilitated the transfer of ground-breaking technological skills into Ancient Greece; respectively, the phonetic written script and the minting of coinage (to use a token currency, where the value is guaranteed by the state). Both inventions were rapidly adopted by surrounding nations through further trade and cooperation and have been of fundamental benefit to the progress of civilization.

Throughout history, victors have sometimes used ruthless measures to impose peace upon the vanquished. In his book Agricola, the Roman historian Tacitus includes eloquent and vicious polemics against the rapacity and greed of Rome. One, that Tacitus says is by the Caledonian chieftain Calgacus, ends with: Auferre trucidare rapere falsis nominibus imperium, atque ubi solitudinem faciunt, pacem appellant. (To ravage, to slaughter, to usurp under false titles, they call empire; and where they make a desert, they call it peace. — Oxford Revised Translation).

Discussion of peace is therefore at the same time a discussion on its form.. Is it simply the absence of mass organized killing (war), or does peace require a particular morality and justice? (just peace).
A peace must be seen at least in two forms:
 A simple silence of arms, absence of war.
 Absence of war accompanied by particular requirements for the mutual settlement of relations, which are characterized by terms such as justice, mutual respect, respect for law and good will.

Since 1945, the United Nations and the United Nations Security Council have operated under the aim to resolve conflicts without war. Nonetheless, nations have entered numerous military conflicts since then.

Organizations and prizes

United Nations 

The United Nations (UN) is an international organization whose stated aims are to facilitate cooperation in international law, international security, economic development, social progress, human rights, and achieving world peace. The UN was founded in 1945 after World War II to replace the League of Nations, to stop wars between countries, and to provide a platform for dialogue.

After authorization by the Security Council, the UN sends peacekeepers to regions where armed conflict has recently ceased or paused to enforce the terms of peace agreements and to discourage combatants from resuming hostilities. Since the UN does not maintain its own military, peacekeeping forces are voluntarily provided by member states of the UN. The forces, also called the "Blue Helmets", who enforce UN accords are awarded United Nations Medals, which are considered international decorations instead of military decorations. The peacekeeping force as a whole received the Nobel Peace Prize in 1988.

Police

	
The obligation of the state to provide for domestic peace within its borders in usually charged to the police and other general domestic policing activities. The police are a constituted body of persons empowered by a state to enforce the law, to protect the lives, liberty and possessions of citizens, and to prevent crime and civil disorder. Their powers include the power of arrest and the legitimized use of force. The term is most commonly associated with the police forces of a sovereign state that are authorized to exercise the police power of that state within a defined legal or territorial area of responsibility. Police forces are often defined as being separate from the military and other organizations involved in the defense of the state against foreign aggressors; however, gendarmerie are military units charged with civil policing. Police forces are usually public sector services, funded through taxes.

National security

It is the obligation of national security to provide for peace and security in a nation against foreign threats and foreign aggression. Potential causes of national insecurity include actions by other states (e.g. military or cyber attack), violent non-state actors (e.g. terrorist attack), organised criminal groups such as narcotic cartels, and also the effects of natural disasters (e.g. flooding, earthquakes). Systemic drivers of insecurity, which may be transnational, include climate change, economic inequality and marginalisation, political exclusion, and militarisation. In view of the wide range of risks, the preservation of peace and the security of a nation state have several dimensions, including economic security, energy security, physical security, environmental security, food security, border security, and cyber security. These dimensions correlate closely with elements of national power.

League of Nations
The principal forerunner of the United Nations was the League of Nations. It was created at the Paris Peace Conference of 1919, and emerged from the advocacy of Woodrow Wilson and other idealists during World War I. The Covenant of the League of Nations was included in the Treaty of Versailles in 1919, and the League was based in Geneva until its dissolution as a result of World War II and replacement by the United Nations. The high hopes widely held for the League in the 1920s, for example amongst members of the League of Nations Union, gave way to widespread disillusion in the 1930s as the League struggled to respond to challenges from Nazi Germany, Fascist Italy, and Japan.

One of the most important scholars of the League of Nations was Sir Alfred Eckhard Zimmern. Like many of the other British enthusiasts for the League, such as Gilbert Murray and Florence Stawell – known as the "Greece and peace" set – he came to this from the study of the classics.

The creation of the League of Nations, and the hope for informed public opinion on international issues (expressed for example by the Union for Democratic Control during World War I), also saw the creation after World War I of bodies dedicated to understanding international affairs, such as the Council on Foreign Relations in New York and the Royal Institute of International Affairs at Chatham House in London. At the same time, the academic study of international relations started to professionalise, with the creation of the first professorship of international politics, named for Woodrow Wilson, at Aberystwyth, Wales, in 1919.

Olympic Games
The late 19th century idealist advocacy of peace which led to the creation of the Nobel Peace Prize, the Rhodes Scholarships, the Carnegie Endowment for International Peace, and ultimately the League of Nations, also saw the re-emergence of the ancient Olympic ideal. Led by Pierre de Coubertin, this culminated in the holding in 1896 of the first of the modern Olympic Games.

Nobel Peace Prize

The highest honour awarded to peace makers is the Nobel Prize in Peace, awarded since 1901 by the Norwegian Nobel Committee. It is awarded annually to internationally notable persons following the prize's creation in the will of Alfred Nobel. According to Nobel's will, the Peace Prize shall be awarded to the person who "...shall have done the most or the best work for fraternity between nations, for the abolition or reduction of standing armies, and for the holding and promotion of peace congresses."

Rhodes, Fulbright and Schwarzman scholarships
In creating the Rhodes Scholarships for outstanding students from the United States, Germany and much of the British Empire, Cecil Rhodes wrote in 1901 that 'the object is that an understanding between the three great powers will render war impossible and educational relations make the strongest tie'. This peace purpose of the Rhodes Scholarships was very prominent in the first half of the 20th century, and became prominent again in recent years under Warden of the Rhodes House Donald Markwell, a historian of thought about the causes of war and peace. This vision greatly influenced Senator J. William Fulbright in the goal of the Fulbright fellowships to promote international understanding and peace, and has guided many other international fellowship programs, including the Schwarzman Scholars to China created by Stephen A. Schwarzman in 2013.

Gandhi Peace Prize

The International Gandhi Peace Prize, named after Mahatma Gandhi, is awarded annually by the Government of India. It was launched as a tribute to the ideals espoused by Gandhi in 1995 on the occasion of the 125th anniversary of his birth. This is an annual award given to individuals and institutions for their contributions towards social, economic and political transformation through non-violence and other Gandhian methods. The award carries Rs. 10 million in cash, convertible in any currency in the world, a plaque and a citation. It is open to all persons regardless of nationality, race, creed or sex.

Student Peace Prize

The Student Peace Prize is awarded biennially to a student or a student organization that has made a significant contribution to promoting peace and human rights.

Ahmadiyya Muslim Peace Prize

The Ahmadiyya Muslim Peace Prize, is awarded annually "in recognition of an individual’s or an organisation’s contribution for the advancement of the cause of peace". The prize was first launched in 2009 by the Ahmadiyya Muslim Peace Prize Committee under the directive of the caliph of the Ahmadiyya Muslim Community, Mirza Masroor Ahmad.

Culture of Peace News Network

The Culture of Peace News Network, otherwise known simply as CPNN, is a UN authorized interactive online news network, committed to supporting the global movement for a culture of peace.

Sydney Peace Prize
Every year in the first week of November, the Sydney Peace Foundation presents the Sydney Peace Prize. The Sydney Peace Prize is awarded to an organization or an individual whose life and work has demonstrated significant contributions to:
The achievement of peace with justice locally, nationally or internationally
The promotion and attainment of human rights
The philosophy, language and practice of non-violence

Museums

A peace museum is a museum that documents historical peace initiatives. Many provide advocacy programs for nonviolent conflict resolution. This may include conflicts at the personal, regional or international level.

Smaller institutions include the Randolph Bourne Institute, the McGill Middle East Program of Civil Society and Peace Building and the International Festival of Peace Poetry..

Religious beliefs 

Religious beliefs often seek to identify and address the basic problems of human life, including conflicts between, among, and within persons and societies. In ancient Greek-speaking areas, the virtue of peace was personified as the goddess Eirene, and in Latin-speaking areas as the goddess Pax. Her image was typically represented by ancient sculptors as a full-grown woman, usually with a horn of plenty and scepter and sometimes with a torch or olive leaves.

Christianity

Christians, who believe Jesus of Nazareth to be the Jewish Messiah called Christ (meaning Anointed One), interpret Isaiah 9:6 as a messianic prophecy of Jesus in which he is called the "Prince of Peace." In the Gospel of Luke, Zechariah celebrates his son John: And you, child, will be called prophet of the Most High, for you will go before the Lord to prepare his ways, to give his people knowledge of salvation through the forgiveness of their sins, because of the tender mercy of our God by which the daybreak from on high will visit us to shine on those who sit in darkness and death's shadow, to guide our feet into the path of peace.

As a testimony of peace, Churches of the Anabaptist Christian tradition (such as the Mennonites), as well Holiness Methodist Pacifists (such as the Immanuel Missionary Church) and Quakers (such as the Conservative Friends), practice nonresistance and do not participate in warfare.

In the Catholic Church, numerous pontifical documents on the Holy Rosary document a continuity of views of the Popes to have confidence in the Holy Rosary as a means to foster peace. Subsequently, to the Encyclical Mense maio,1965, in which he urged the practice of the Holy Rosary, "the prayer so dear to the Virgin and so much recommended by the Supreme Pontiffs," and as reaffirmed in the encyclical Christi Matri, 1966, to implore peace, Pope Paul VI stated in the apostolic Recurrens mensis, October 1969, that the Rosary is a prayer that favors the great gift of peace.

Hinduism
Hindu texts contain the following passages:

Buddhism
Buddhists believe that peace can be attained once all suffering ends. They regard all suffering as stemming from cravings (in the extreme, greed), aversions (fears), or delusions. To eliminate such suffering and achieve personal peace, followers in the path of the Buddha adhere to a set of teachings called the Four Noble Truths — a central tenet in Buddhist philosophy.

Islam
Islam derived from the root word salam which literally means peace. Muslims are called followers of Islam. Quran clearly stated "Those who have believed and whose hearts are assured by the remembrance of Allah. Unquestionably, by the remembrance of Allah, hearts are assured" and stated "O you who have believed, when you are told, "Space yourselves" in assemblies, then make space; Allah will make space for you. And when you are told, "Arise," then arise; Allah will raise those who have believed among you and those who were given knowledge, by degrees. And Allah is Acquainted with what you do."

Judaism 
The Judaic tradition directly associates God with peace, as evidenced by various principles and laws in Judaism.
Shalom, the biblical and modern Hebrew word for peace, is one of the names for God according to the Judaic law and tradition. For instance, in traditional Jewish law, individuals are prohibited from saying "Shalom" when they are in the bathroom as there is a prohibition on uttering any of God's names in the bathroom, out of respect for the divine name.
Jewish liturgy and prayer is replete with prayers asking God to establish peace in the world.
The Shmoneh Esreh, a key prayer in Judaism that is recited three times each day, concludes with a blessing for peace. The last blessing of the Shmoneh Esreh, also known as the Amida ("standing" as the prayer is said while standing), is focused on peace, beginning and ending with supplications for peace and blessings.
Peace is central to Judaism's core principle of Moshaich ("messiah") which connotes a time of universal peace and abundance, a time where weapons will be turned into plowshares and lions will sleep with lambs. As it is written in the Book of Isaiah 2:4 and 11:6-9:

This last metaphor from Tanakh (Hebrew bible) symbolizes the peace that a longed for messianic age will be characterized by, a peace where natural enemies, the strong and the weak, predator and prey, will live in harmony.

Jews pray for the messianic age of peace every day in the Shmoneh Esreh in addition to faith in the coming of the messianic age constituting one of the thirteen core principles of faith in Judaism, according to Maimonides.

Ideological beliefs

Pacifism

Pacifism is the categorical opposition to the behaviors of war or violence as a means of settling disputes or of gaining advantage. Pacifism covers a spectrum of views ranging from the belief that international disputes can and should all be resolved via peaceful behaviors; to calls for the abolition of various organizations which tend to institutionalize aggressive behaviors, such as the military, or arms manufacturers; to opposition to any organization of society that might rely in any way upon governmental force.  Such groups which sometimes oppose the governmental use of force include anarchists and libertarians.  Absolute pacifism opposes violent behavior under all circumstance, including defense of self and others.

Pacifism may be based on moral principles (a deontological view) or pragmatism (a consequentialist view). Principled pacifism holds that all forms of violent behavior are inappropriate responses to conflict, and are morally wrong.  Pragmatic pacifism holds that the costs of war and inter-personal violence are so substantial that better ways of resolving disputes must be found.

Inner peace, meditation and prayerfulness

Psychological or inner peace (i.e. peace of mind) refers to a state of being internally or spiritually at peace, with sufficient knowledge and understanding to keep oneself calm in the face of apparent discord or stress. Being internally "at peace" is considered by many to be a healthy mental state, or homeostasis and to be the opposite of feeling stressful, mentally anxious, or emotionally unstable. Within the meditative traditions, the psychological or inward achievement of "peace of mind" is often associated with bliss and happiness.

Peace of mind, serenity, and calmness are descriptions of a disposition free from the effects of stress. In some meditative traditions, inner peace is believed to be a state of consciousness or enlightenment that may be cultivated by various types of meditation, prayer, t'ai chi ch'uan (太极拳, tàijíquán), yoga, or other various types of mental or physical disciplines. Many such practices refer to this peace as an experience of knowing oneself. An emphasis on finding one's inner peace is often associated with traditions such as Buddhism, Hinduism, and some traditional Christian contemplative practices such as monasticism, as well as with the New Age movement.

Non-Aggression Principle
The Non-Aggression Principle (NAP) asserts that aggression against an individual or an individual's property is always an immoral violation of one's life, liberty, and property rights.  Utilizing deceit instead of consent to achieve ends is also a violation of the Non-Aggression principle. Therefore, under the framework of the Non-Aggression principle, rape, murder, deception, involuntary taxation, government regulation, and other behaviors that initiate aggression against otherwise peaceful individuals are considered violations of this principle. This principle is most commonly adhered to by libertarians. A common elevator pitch for this principle is, "Good ideas don't require force."

Satyagraha

Satyagraha is a philosophy and practice of nonviolent resistance developed by Mohandas Karamchand Gandhi. He deployed satyagraha techniques in campaigns for Indian independence and also during his earlier struggles in South Africa.

The word satyagraha itself was coined through a public contest that Gandhi sponsored through the newspaper he published in South Africa, Indian Opinion, when he realized that neither the common, contemporary Hindu language nor the English language contained a word which fully expressed his own meanings and intentions when he talked about his nonviolent approaches to conflict. According to Gandhi's autobiography, the contest winner was Maganlal Gandhi (presumably no relation), who submitted the entry 'sadagraha', which Gandhi then modified to 'satyagraha'. Etymologically, this Hindic word means 'truth-firmness', and is commonly translated as 'steadfastness in the truth' or 'truth-force'.

Satyagraha theory also influenced Martin Luther King Jr., James Bevel, and others during the campaigns they led during the civil rights movement in the United States. The theory of satyagraha sees means and ends as inseparable. Therefore, it is contradictory to try to use violence to obtain peace. As Gandhi wrote: "They say, 'means are, after all, means'. I would say, 'means are, after all, everything'. As the means so the end..." A quote sometimes attributed to Gandhi, but also to A. J. Muste, sums it up: "There is no way to peace; peace is the way".

Monuments
The following are monuments to peace:

Theories

Many different theories of "peace" exist in the world of peace studies, which involves the study of de-escalation, conflict transformation, disarmament, and cessation of violence. The definition of "peace" can vary with religion, culture, or subject of study.

Balance of power

The classical "realist" position is that the key to promoting order between states, and so of increasing the chances of peace, is the maintenance of a balance of power between states – a situation where no state is so dominant that it can "lay down the law to the rest". Exponents of this view have included Metternich, Bismarck, Hans Morgenthau, and Henry Kissinger. A related approach – more in the tradition of Hugo Grotius than Thomas Hobbes – was articulated by the so-called "English school of international relations theory" such as Martin Wight in his book Power Politics (1946, 1978) and Hedley Bull in The Anarchical Society (1977).

As the maintenance of a balance of power could in some circumstances require a willingness to go to war, some critics saw the idea of a balance of power as promoting war rather than promoting peace. This was a radical critique of those supporters of the Allied and Associated Powers who justified entry into World War I on the grounds that it was necessary to preserve the balance of power in Europe from a German bid for hegemony.

In the second half of the 20th century, and especially during the cold war, a particular form of balance of power – mutual nuclear deterrence – emerged as a widely held doctrine on the key to peace between the great powers. Critics argued that the development of nuclear stockpiles increased the chances of war rather than peace, and that the "nuclear umbrella" made it "safe" for smaller wars (e.g. the Vietnam war and the Soviet invasion of Czechoslovakia to end the Prague Spring), so making such wars more likely.

Free trade and interdependence 

It was a central tenet of classical liberalism, for example among English liberal thinkers of the late 19th and early 20th century, that free trade promoted peace. For example, the Cambridge economist John Maynard Keynes (1883–1946) said that he was "brought up" on this idea and held it unquestioned until at least the 1920s. During the economic globalization in the decades leading up to World War I, writers such as Norman Angell argued that the growth of economic interdependence between the great powers made war between them futile and therefore unlikely. He made this argument in 1913. A year later Europe's economically interconnected states were embroiled in what would later become known as the First World War.

Democratic peace theory 

The democratic peace theory posits that democracy causes peace because of the accountability, institutions, values, and norms of democratic countries.

Territorial peace theory 

The territorial peace theory posits that peace causes democracy because territorial wars between neighbor countries lead to authoritarian attitudes and disregard for democratic values. 
This theory is supported by historical studies showing that countries rarely become democratic until after their borders have been settled by territorial peace with neighbor countries.

War game 

The Peace and War Game is an approach in game theory to understand the relationship between peace and conflicts.

The iterated game hypotheses was originally used by academic groups and computer simulations to study possible strategies of cooperation and aggression.

As peace makers became richer over time, it became clear that making war had greater costs than initially anticipated. One of the well studied strategies that acquired wealth more rapidly was based on Genghis Khan, i.e. a constant aggressor making war continually to gain resources. This led, in contrast, to the development of what's known as the "provokable nice guy strategy", a peace-maker until attacked, improved upon merely to win by occasional forgiveness even when attacked. By adding the results of all pairwise games for each player, one sees that multiple players gain wealth cooperating with each other while bleeding a constantly aggressive player.

Socialism and managed capitalism
Socialist, communist, and left-wing liberal writers of the 19th and 20th centuries (e.g., Lenin, J.A. Hobson, John Strachey) argued that capitalism caused war (e.g. through promoting imperial or other economic rivalries that lead to international conflict). This led some to argue that international socialism was the key to peace.

However, in response to such writers in the 1930s who argued that capitalism caused war, the economist John Maynard Keynes (1883–1946) argued that managed capitalism could promote peace. This involved international coordination of fiscal/monetary policies, an international monetary system that did not pit the interests of countries against each other, and a high degree of freedom of trade. These ideas underlay Keynes's work during World War II that led to the creation of the International Monetary Fund and the World Bank at Bretton Woods in 1944, and later of the General Agreement on Tariffs and Trade (subsequently the World Trade Organization).

International organization and law
One of the most influential theories of peace, especially since Woodrow Wilson led the creation of the League of Nations at the Paris Peace Conference of 1919, is that peace will be advanced if the intentional anarchy of states is replaced through the growth of international law promoted and enforced through international organizations such as the League of Nations, the United Nations, and other functional international organizations. One of the most important early exponents of this view was Alfred Eckhart Zimmern, for example in his 1936 book The League of Nations and the Rule of Law.

Trans-national solidarity
Many "idealist" thinkers about international relations – e.g. in the traditions of Kant and Karl Marx – have argued that the key to peace is the growth of some form of solidarity between peoples (or classes of people) spanning the lines of cleavage between nations or states that lead to war.

One version of this is the idea of promoting international understanding between nations through the international mobility of students – an idea most powerfully advanced by Cecil Rhodes in the creation of the Rhodes Scholarships, and his successors such as J. William Fulbright.

Another theory is that peace can be developed among countries on the basis of active management of water resources.

Day
Peace day was founded as a day to recognize, honour and promote peace. It is commemorated each year by United Nations members.

Studies, rankings, and periods

Peace and conflict studies

Peace and conflict studies is an academic field which identifies and analyses violent and nonviolent behaviours, as well as the structural mechanisms attending violent and non-violent social conflicts.  This is to better understand the processes leading to a more desirable human condition. One variation,
Peace studies (irenology), is an interdisciplinary effort aiming at the prevention, de-escalation, and solution of conflicts. This contrasts with war studies (polemology), directed at the efficient attainment of victory in conflicts. Disciplines involved may include political science, geography, economics, psychology, sociology, international relations, history, anthropology, religious studies, and gender studies, as well as a variety of other disciplines.

Measurement and ranking

Although peace is widely perceived as something intangible, various organizations have been making efforts to quantify and measure it. The Global Peace Index produced by the Institute for Economics and Peace is a known effort to evaluate peacefulness in countries based on 23 indicators of the absence of violence and absence of the fear of violence.

The last edition of the Index ranks 163 countries on their internal and external levels of peace. According to the 2017 Global Peace Index, Iceland is the most peaceful country in the world while Syria is the least peaceful one. Fragile States Index (formerly known as the Failed States Index) created by the Fund for Peace focuses on risk for instability or violence in 178 nations. This index measures how fragile a state is by 12 indicators and subindicators that evaluate aspects of politics, social economy, and military facets in countries. The 2015 Failed State Index reports that the most fragile nation is South Sudan, and the least fragile one is Finland. University of Maryland publishes the Peace and Conflict Instability Ledger in order to measure peace. It grades 163 countries with 5 indicators, and pays the most attention to risk of political instability or armed conflict over a three-year period. The most recent ledger shows that the most peaceful country is Slovenia on the contrary Afghanistan is the most conflicted nation. Besides indicated above reports from the Institute for Economics and Peace, Fund for Peace, and University of Maryland, other organizations including George Mason University release indexes that rank countries in terms of peacefulness.

Long periods

The longest continuing period of peace and neutrality among currently existing states is observed in Sweden since 1814 and in Switzerland, which has had an official policy of neutrality since 1815. This was made possible partly by the periods of relative peace in Europe and the world known as Pax Britannica (1815–1914), Pax Europaea/Pax Americana (since 1950s), and Pax Atomica (also since the 1950s).

Other examples of long periods of peace are:
 the isolationistic Edo period (also known as Tokugawa shogunate) in Japan 1603 to 1868 (265 years)
 Pax Khazarica in Khazar Khanate (south-east Turkey) about 700–950 AD (250 years)
 Pax Romana in the Roman empire (for 190 or 206 years).

See also

 Anti-war
 Catholic peace traditions
 Grey-zone (international relations)
 Group on International Perspectives on Governmental Aggression and Peace (GIPGAP)
 Human overpopulation#Warfare and conflict over dwindling resources
 List of peace activists
 List of places named Peace
 List of peace prizes
 Moral syncretism
 Nonkilling
 Nonviolence
 Non-aggression principle
 Peace education
 Peace in Islamic philosophy
 Peace Journalism
 Peace makers
 Peace One Day
 Peace Palace
 Peace symbol
 Perpetual peace
 Prayer for Peace
 Structural violence
 Sulh
 War resister

References

Notes

Sir Norman Angell. The Great Illusion. 1909
Raymond Aron, Peace and War. London: Weidenfeld & Nicolson, 1966
Hedley Bull. The Anarchical Society. Macmillan, 1977
Sir Herbert Butterfield. Christianity, Diplomacy and War. 1952
Martin Ceadel. Pacifism in Britain, 1914–1945: The Defining of a Faith. Oxford: Clarendon Press, 1980
Martin Ceadel. Semi-Detached Idealists: The British Peace Movement and International Relations, 1854–1945. Oxford: Oxford University Press, 2000.
Martin Ceadel. The Origins of War Prevention: The British Peace Movement and International Relations, 1730–1854. Oxford: Oxford University Press, 1996
Martin Ceadel. Thinking about Peace and War. Oxford: Oxford University Press, 1987
Inis L. Claude, Jr. Swords into Ploughshares: The Problems and Progress of International Organization. 1971
Michael W. Doyle. Ways of War and Peace: Realism, Liberalism, and Socialism. W.W. Norton, 1997
Sir Harry Hinsley. Power and the Pursuit of Peace. Cambridge: Cambridge University Press, 1962
Andrew Hurrell. On Global Order. Oxford: Oxford University Press, 2008
Immanuel Kant. Perpetual Peace. 1795
Donald Markwell. John Maynard Keynes and International Relations: Economic Paths to War and Peace. Oxford: Oxford University Press, 2006.
Donald Markwell. "Instincts to Lead": On Leadership, Peace, and Education. Connor Court, 2013
Hans Morgenthau. Politics Among Nations. 1948
Steven Pinker. The Better Angels of Our Nature: Why Violence Has Declined. Viking, 2011
Sir Alfred Eckhard Zimmern. The League of Nations and the Rule of Law. Macmillan, 1936
Kenneth Waltz. Man, the State and War. Princeton: Princeton University Press, 1978
Michael Walzer. Just and Unjust War. Basic Books, 1977
Jeni Whalan. How Peace Operations Work. Oxford University Press, 2013
Martin Wight. Power Politics. 1946 (2nd edition, 1978)
Letter from Birmingham Jail by Rev. Martin Luther King Jr.
"Pennsylvania, A History of the Commonwealth," esp. pg. 109, edited by Randall M. Miller and William Pencak, The Pennsylvania State University Press, 2002
Peaceful Societies, Alternatives to Violence and War Short profiles on 25 peaceful societies.
The Path to Peace, by Laure Paquette
Prefaces to Peace: a Symposium [i.e. anthology], Consisting of [works by] Wendell L. Willkie, Herbert Hoover and Hugh Gibson, Henry A. Wallace, [and] Sumner Welles. "Cooperatively published by Simon and Schuster; Doubleday, Doran, and Co.; Reynal & Hitchcock; [and] Columbia University Press", [194-]. xii, 437 p.

External links

 Carnegie Endowment for International Peace
 Lemonade a la Carnegie accessed 16 October 2012
 Research Guide on Peace by the United Nations Library at Geneva
 PeaceWiki
 Peace Monuments Around the World
 
 Working Group on Peace and Development (FriEnt)
 Answers to: "How do we achieve world peace?"
 World Alliance of Religions Peace Summit (WARP Summit)

 
Nonviolence
Pacifism
Ethical principles
Political concepts
Social concepts
Virtue
Fruit of the Holy Spirit